Schiavoni may refer to:

 Schiavoni, plural of Schiavone
 Joe Schiavoni
 Molise Croats